Tulcus pallidus is a species of beetle in the family Cerambycidae. It was described by Dillon and Dillon in 1945. It is known from Colombia and Panama.

References

pallidus
Beetles described in 1945